Sarwan Khera is a town in Kanpur Dehat district in the state of Uttar Pradesh, India approximately  south of Mati.   The C A Kanpur Airport and Lalpur Railway Station are the closest mass transportation points.  A public health clinic operated by the National Population Stabilisation Fund is located here.

References

Cities and towns in Kanpur Dehat district